The West Pauwasi languages are a likely family of Papuan languages spoken on the Indonesian side of New Guinea. They may either form part of a larger Pauwasi language family along with the Eastern Pauwasi languages, or it they could form an independent language family (or more than one family).

Languages
The languages are,

Tebi–Towe
Tebi (Dubu)
Towei
Namla–Tofanma
Namla
Tofanma
Usku (Afra)

The three branches differ substantially from each other.

References

External links

Pauwasi languages database at TransNewGuinea.org

 
Pauwasi languages